Bornesketaig, Scottish Gaelic Borgh na Sgiotaig, is a dispersed crofting settlement in Trotternish on the Isle of Skye.

Broch
A broch once stood nearby, but little remains as the stones have been robbed for other uses. There are a number of caves in the cliffs around Bornesketaig.

Gallery

References

Populated places in the Isle of Skye